Thomas Lester may refer to:

Thomas Lester (business) (1791–1867), English merchant
Tom Lester (1938–2020), American actor and evangelist
Tom Lester (American football) (1927–2012), American football coach

See also
Thomas Lister (disambiguation)